Pierre-Cyrille Hautcœur (born 9 October 1964) is a French economist and Professor at the Paris School of Economics. Hautcoeurs research interests include money, credit and long-run finance. His research was awarded the Best Young French Economist Award in 2003.

References

External links

 Profile of Pierre-Cyrille Hautcoeur on the website of the Paris School of Economics

1964 births
Living people
French economists
Academic staff of the Paris School of Economics
Lycée Henri-IV alumni
École Normale Supérieure alumni